Child grooming is befriending and establishing an emotional connection with a minor under the age of consent, and sometimes the child's family, to lower the child's inhibitions with the objective of sexual abuse.  Child grooming is also used to lure minors into various illicit businesses such as  child trafficking, child prostitution, cybersex trafficking, or the production of child pornography.

Such behaviour has been proscribed in various ways since the International Convention for the Suppression of the Traffic in Women and Children, which was agreed upon in 1921 as a multilateral treaty of the (now defunct) League of Nations and addressed the problem of international trafficking of women and children. The proscribed traffic was international at that time. The concept of localised grooming, in which gangs groom neighbourhood victims, was defined in 2010 by the UK Child Exploitation and Online Protection Centre.

Child grooming is a serious crime and a form of child abuse. It can occur in various settings, including online, in person, and through other means of communication. Children who are groomed may experience psychological harm and may be coerced into engaging in sexual activity or other forms of exploitation.

Characteristics

To establish a good relationship with a child and the child's family, child groomers might do several things: They might try to gain the child's or parents' trust by befriending them, with the goal of easy access to the child. A trusting relationship with the family means the child's parents are less likely to believe potential accusations. Child groomers might look for opportunities to have time alone with the child, which can be done by offering to babysit; the groomers may also invite the child for sleepovers, for opportunistic bed sharing. They might give gifts or money to the child in exchange for sexual contact, or for no apparent reason. Commonly, they show pornography to the child, or talk about sexual topics with the child, hoping to make it easy for the child to accept such acts, thus normalizing the behavior. They may also engage in hugging, kissing, or other physical contact, even when the child does not want it.

Suspected offenders have used the so-called "fantasy defense", the argument that they were only expressing fantasies and not plans of future behavior, to defend actions such as online communication. In the U.S., case law draws a distinction between those two and some people accused of "grooming" have successfully used this defense.

Other signs that characterize child groomers include: A person who takes an unusual interest in a child, particularly if the interest is primarily focused on their physical appearance, behavior or activities; A person who tries to communicate with a child online or in person in secret, outside the knowledge of the child's parents or guardians; A person who attempts to isolate a child from their friends or family, or who discourages the child from spending time with others;  A person who asks a child to keep secrets or who makes the child feel like they are special or important in a way that is inappropriate.

Over the internet
Sexual grooming of children also occurs on the internet. Some abusers (sometimes posing as children themselves) chat with children online and make arrangements to meet with them in person. Online grooming of minors is most prevalent in relation to the 13–17 age group (99% of cases), and particularly 13–14 (48%). The majority of targeted children are girls, and most victimization occurs with mobile-phone support. Children and teenagers with behavioural issues such as "high attention seeking" are at higher risk than others.

Facebook has been involved in controversy as to whether it takes enough precautions against the sexual grooming of children. Jim Gamble, leader of the Child Exploitation and Online Protection Centre (CEOP) in the UK, said in 2010 that his office had received 292 complaints about Facebook users in 2009 but that none of the complaints had come directly from Facebook. A spokesman for Facebook responded to complaints by meeting CEOP directly in person, and said that they take safety issues "very seriously". In 2003, MSN implemented chat room restrictions to help protect children from adults seeking sexual conversations with them. In 2005, Yahoo! chat rooms were investigated by the New York State attorney general's office for allowing users to create rooms whose names suggested they were being used for this purpose; that October, Yahoo! agreed to "implement policies and procedures designed to ensure" that such rooms would not be allowed. Computer programs have been developed to analyse chat rooms and other instant messaging logs for suspicious activity. As this can be prevented not only on platform level but also on the point of entry, it is recommended that parents establish safe environments for their children to use the internet, with reduced risk of encountering cyber grooming individuals.

Pedophiles and predators use online grooming to carry out cybersex trafficking crimes. After the pedophile gains the trust from a local cybersex trafficker, often a parent or neighbor of the victim, the online sexual exploitation will take place.

In the US, an online privacy law, Children's Online Privacy Protection Act, has been misattributed as a measure to prevent online child grooming and protect children from child predators.

Localised grooming
"Localised grooming" refers in the UK to the on-street grooming of children, usually by a group of abusers. According to a 2013 report by the House of Commons Home Affairs Select Committee, after the group's initial contact with the child, offers of treats (takeaway food, cigarettes, drugs) persuade the child to maintain the relationship. One abuser might present himself as the "boyfriend"; this person arranges for the child to be raped by other members of the group. Children may end up being raped by dozens of these group members, and maybe trafficked to connected groups in other towns. The Child Exploitation and Online Protection Centre defines "local grooming" as follows:

 Localized grooming is a form of sexual exploitation – previously referred to as ‘on street grooming’ in the media –where children have been groomed and sexually exploited by an offender, having initially met in a location outside their home. This location is usually in public, such as a park, cinema, on the street or at a friend’s house. Offenders often act together, establishing a relationship with a child or children before sexually exploiting them. Some victims of ‘street grooming’ may believe that the offender is an older ‘boyfriend’; these victims introduce their peers to the offender group who might then go on to be sexually exploited as well. Abuse may occur at several locations within a region and on several occasions.  ‘Localised grooming’ was the term used by CEOP in the intelligence requests issued to police forces and other service agencies to define the data we wished to receive.

A television documentary was broadcast in August 2003, in which reporters uncovered details of an 18-month police and social services investigation into allegations that young British Asian men were targeting under-age girls for sex, drugs and prostitution in the West Yorkshire town of Keighley. The Leeds-based Coalition for the Removal of Pimping (Crop) sought to bring this behaviour to national attention from at least 2010. In November 2010, the Rotherham sex grooming case saw several convictions of child sexual abusers. In 2012, members of the Rochdale sex trafficking gang were convicted on various counts, and in 2016, following the largest child sexual exploitation investigation in the UK, "bigger than high profile cases in Rochdale and Rotherham", 18 men in the Halifax child sex abuse ring case were sentenced to over 175 years in prison.

These cases prompted several investigations looking into how prevalent British Asian backgrounds were in localised grooming; the first was by Quilliam in December 2017, which released a report entitled "Group Based Child Sexual Exploitation – Dissecting Grooming Gangs", which claimed 84% of offenders were of South Asian heritage. However this report was "fiercely" criticised for its unscientific nature and poor methodology by child sexual exploitation experts Ella Cockbain and Waqas Tufail, in their paper "Failing Victims, Fuelling Hate: Challenging the Harms of the 'Muslim grooming gangs' Narrative" which was published in January 2020.

A further investigation was carried out by the British government in December 2020, which concluded that "Beyond specific high-profile cases, the academic literature highlights significant limitations to what can be said about links between ethnicity and this form of offending. Research has found that group-based CSE offenders are most commonly White. Some studies suggest an over-representation of Black and Asian offenders relative to the demographics of national populations. However, it is not possible to conclude that this is representative of all group-based CSE offending. This is due to issues such as data quality problems, the way the samples were selected in studies, and the potential for bias and inaccuracies in the way that ethnicity data is collected"; the report also added "Based on the existing evidence, and our understanding of the flaws in the existing data, it seems most likely that the ethnicity of group-based CSE offenders is in line with CSA [child sexual abuse] more generally and with the general population, with the majority of offenders being White".

Writing in The Guardian, Cockbain and Tufail wrote of the report that "The two-year study by the Home Office makes very clear that there are no grounds for asserting that Muslim or Pakistani-heritage men are disproportionately engaged in such crimes, and, citing our research, it confirmed the unreliability of the Quilliam claim". The British government originally refused to release the report but eventually did so after public pressure.

In 2013, BBC Inside Out London investigated allegations made by members of the Sikh community that British Sikh girls living inside Britain were being targeted by men who pretend(ed) to be Sikhs. However an investigation by the Sikh scholar Katy Sian of the University of York found no truth to the allegations and instead found it was an allegation being pushed by extremist Sikh groups. Further reports compiled by the British government and child sex exploitation scholars also confirmed there was no evidence to this.

Criminal offenses

General
In its report Protection of Children Against Abuse Through New Technologies, the Council of Europe Cybercrime Convention Committee addressed the emerging issues of violence against children through the use of new technologies (the issue of child pornography on the Internet is already covered by Article 9 Convention) with particular reference to grooming both through the internet and by mobile telephones.

Some nations have already criminalized grooming in their national legislation. Analysis of these laws suggests some may be redundant with existing legislation and/or practices.

Australia
Australian Criminal Code Act 1995 section 474.26 and 474.27 prohibits the use of a "carrier service" to communicate with the intent to procure a person under the age of 16, or expose such a person to any indecent matter for grooming. The various states and territories have similar laws, some of which use a different ages (for example the victim only has to be under 16 in Queensland). Such laws across Australia were recently strengthened in the wake of the murder of Carly Ryan.

Canada
In Canada, Criminal Code section 172.1 makes it an offence to communicate with a child through a computer system to commit a sexual offence (termed "luring a child").

Costa Rica
In Costa Rica, since April 2013, the Criminal Code section 167 bis, makes it an offence to seduce a child by electronic means.  With penalties from one to 3 years of imprisonment for a person that, by any means attempts to establish an erotic or sexual communication with a child under 15 years old.

Germany
In Germany, under § 176 of the Strafgesetzbuch (Criminal Code) it is a criminal offence to entice a child (14 or younger) into sexual actions or to use telecommunications to try to entice them into sexual actions or child pornography. In January 2020, the law was extended to include cases of attempted cyber grooming in which perpetrators "groomed" investigators or parents, believing them to be a child.

Netherlands
On 1 January 2010, section 248e was added to the Dutch Criminal Code making it an offence to arrange online or by telephone a meeting with someone he knows or reasonably should assume to be a child under 16, with the intent of sexually abusing the child, as soon as any preparation for this meeting is made. The maximum punishment is 2 years of imprisonment or a fine of the fourth category.

New Zealand 
The law in New Zealand states that it is a crime to meet up or intend to meet up to perform an unlawful sexual act with a person under 16 years. This is recorded in Section 131B of the Crimes Act 1961. This section is labelled ‘Meeting Young Person Following Sexual Grooming, etc’.  Any person charged is liable to imprisonment for a term not exceeding 7 years.

United Kingdom
In England and Wales, sections 14 and 15 of the Sexual Offences Act 2003 make it an offence to arrange a meeting with a child under 16, for oneself or someone else, with the intent of sexually abusing the child. The meeting itself is also an offence in its own right. The offence carries a maximum sentence of 10 years imprisonment and automatic barring of the offender from working with children or vulnerable adults.

The Protection of Children and Prevention of Sexual Offences (Scotland) Act 2005 introduced a similar provision for Scotland.

Thus, a crime may be committed even without the actual meeting taking place and without the child being involved in the meeting (for example, if a police officer has taken over the contact and pretends to be that child). In R v T (2005) EWCA Crim 2681, the appellant, aged 43, had pretended to befriend a nine-year-old girl but had done very little with her before she became suspicious and reported his approaches. He had many previous convictions (including one for rape) and was described as a "relentless, predatory pedophile". The Court of Appeal upheld a sentence of eight years' imprisonment with an extended license period of two years.

United States
In the United States,  makes it a federal offence to use the mail, interstate commerce, etc. to entice a minor to sexual activity for which any person can be charged with a criminal offence.  makes it a federal offence to transmit information about a person below the age of 16 for this purpose. Some states have additional statutes covering seducing a child online, such as the Florida law that makes  "Use of a Computer to Seduce a Child" a felony.

Laws focused on 'grooming' were first enforced federally against Alabamian Jerry Alan Penton in 2009. Penton received 20 years in prison for that action coupled with another 20 for his distribution and possession of child pornography.

See also

References

Further reading

External links
 Internet Watch Foundation
 Grooming Children for Sexual Molestation, written by Gregory M. Weber, the Assistant Attorney General for the State of Wisconsin who specializes in the prosecution of crimes committed against children.
 Cyber Grooming – danger of cyberspace, written by Kamil Kopecký, the professor at Palacký University Olomouc (director of Centre PRVoK)

 
Child abuse
Psychological manipulation
Pedophilia